Rise and Resist is a United States political movement, predominantly based in New York City, formed in response to the 2016 election of Donald Trump. The movement has organized several marches and protests against President Trump and his policies, as well as lent support for similar organizations' protests, such as the 2017 Women's March. In December 2017, the group also participated in protests against Trump's Tax Reform Plan.

Political attitudes 
Rise and Resist have been critical of the Independent Democratic Conference (IDC), a group of eight members of the New York State Senate who were elected as Democrats and are in a majority coalition with the Republicans in the chamber. Rise and Resist has organized several protests targeting IDC members and worked with other progressive activist groups to increase awareness of the IDC's existence and impact on state-level policy.

Protests 
On July 4, 2018 members of the group were arrested after displaying a banner that read "ABOLISH I.C.E" at the Statue of Liberty, while later another member of the organization climbed the base of the monument. Before the banner was displayed the organization used Twitter to announce their actions, posting "Rise and Resist is at the Statue of Liberty demanding Trump and the GOP #AbolishICE, reunite families now, halt deportations and end detention as a deterrent."

References

External links
Rise and Resist Website
Rise and Resist Facebook Group

See also 
 Immigration Policies of President Trump
 Protests Against Trump Administration Family Separation Policy
 Trump Administration Family Separation Policy
 Protests Against Donald Trump

Political movements in the United States